José Melchor Gomis y Colomer (6 January 1791 – 4 August 1836) was a Spanish Romantic composer.

Career
He was born in Ontinyent, Vall d'Albaida, Valencia Province.

He was director of music for an artillery regiment during the Napoleonic Wars. An early melodrame by Gomis for voice and orchestra was performed at Valencia in 1817.

He wrote the music of the Himno de Riego, named after the rebellious General Riego (1784-1823) and since used as the national anthem by various republican governments of Spain.

Gomis's political views caused him to live in exile after the accession of Ferdinand VII in 1823, in Paris and in London. In both cities he was a friend of his fellow exile the composer Santiago Masarnau, whom he may have introduced to London musical life. In Paris, Gomis wrote a successful singing method, published in 1826 with dedications to Gioacchino Rossini and François-Adrien Boieldieu, and in London his choral work L'inverno was performed in 1827. In 1830 his opera Aben-Humeya was performed in Paris. Gomis's Paris operas Diable à Seville (1831) (staged with the support of Rossini) and Le revenant (1836) gained respectful reviews from Hector Berlioz. Le portefaix, the most successful of his operas, had a libretto by Eugène Scribe (originally offered to the composer Giacomo Meyerbeer).

Gomis was made a Chevalier of the Légion d'honneur by King Louis-Philippe. Gomis died in Paris in 1836 of tuberculosis, leaving a number of works unfinished, including the opera Le comte Julien, also to a libretto by Scribe (and eventually set in 1851 by Sigismond Thalberg as Florinda).

Bibliography
 Berlioz, Hector (ed. Katherine Kolb): Berlioz on Music: Selected Criticism, 1824–1837 Oxford: Oxford University Press, 2015); 
 Dowling, John: "Gomis (y Colomer), José Melchor [Melchior]", in Grove Music Online , accessed 23 August 2015.
 Johnson, Janet: "Rossini in Bologna and Paris during the Early 1830s: New Letters", in Revue de Musicologie, vol. 79 (1993) no. 1, pp. 67–83. 
 Letellier, Robert: Meyerbeer’s Les Huguenots: An Evangel of Religion and Love (Cambridge: Cambridge Scholars Publishing, 2014);

References

1791 births
1836 deaths
19th-century classical composers
19th-century deaths from tuberculosis
19th-century Spanish male musicians
Chevaliers of the Légion d'honneur
Male opera composers
People from Vall d'Albaida
Spanish classical composers
Spanish male classical composers
Spanish opera composers
Spanish Romantic composers
Tuberculosis deaths in France